Tragoportax is an extinct mammal genus belonging to the Bovidae.<ref name="roth&wagner1854"/ It lived in the upper Miocene (Vallesian - Turolian, about 11 - 7 million years ago) and its fossil remains have been found in Europe, Asia and Africa.<ref name="solounias1981"/

Description
Tragoportax could reach a considerable size: the largest specimens must have weighed up to 200 kilograms. It had long legs, a skull with a short snout and elongated rear skull, while the antlers were large and curved backwards; the antlers of females and young were smaller and thinner than those of adult males. The cross-section of the horns was usually triangular or subtriangular; the horns had a well-marked posterolateral keel and flat sides. Compared to those of the related species Miotragocerus, the horns were less laterally compressed. The teeth were high-crowned and fitted with dental cement, like those of the present-day nilgai, to which it was closely related. In general, the appearance of Tragoportax must have been reminiscent of that of some present-day large antelopes, such as the waterbuck.

Classification
The first fossils of this animal were described in 1854 by Roth and Wagner under the name Capra amalthea, and a few years later (1861) Gaudry thought it appropriate to reclassify these fossils into a genus of their own (Tragocerus). The name Tragocerus, however, had already been used years earlier, in 1821, by Dejean to describe an insect,<ref name="mindat.org"/ and it was, therefore, necessary to rename the animal. It was Pilgrim in 1937 who coined the generic name Tragoportax.<ref name="pilgrim1937"/

Tragoportax and similar genera are considered to be related to the present-day nilgai, in the subtribe Boselaphini. However, because of their distinct appearance from the nilgai (they were more superficially similar to waterbuck or members of the genus Tragelaphus), they have been ascribed to a distinct group, the Tragocerini.

Several species are known from the genus Tragoportax: the type species is T. salmontanus, described by Pilgrim in 1937 on the basis of fossils found on the Siwaliks in Pakistan; other well-known species are T. amalthea, well known thanks to several fossils found in the Greek deposit of Pikermi, and T. rugosifrons, widespread (Greece, Macedonia, Bulgaria, Moldova, Ukraine, Pakistan, Iran). Other lesser-known species are T. maius of Georgia and Azerbaijan, T. cyrenaicus of Libya, T. macedoniensis of Greece and T. acrae of South Africa. The latter species may have been the last to disappear, in the early Pliocene, and was originally ascribed to a separate genus (Mesembriportax). Another well-known species often ascribed to Tragoportax is T. gaudryi, from various European deposits: however, this form has been reclassified as a species of the related genus Miotragocerus.<ref name="kostopoulos2016"/

Paleobiology
The long legs of Tragoportax indicate that this animal was a fast-running, moving quickly across open, forested plains, and was probably also a good jumper. Some species of this animal have left numerous fossil remains (e.g. T. rugosifrons at the Hadjidimovo site in Bulgaria); a study by from 2004 indicated that in Tragoportax there was strong sexual dimorphism based on the shape and size of the horns.<ref name="spassov&geraads2004"/ This dimorphism would indicate that Tragoportax was a moderately gregarious and partially territorial animal, with well-developed visual signals of intraspecific display. It is possible that there were herds with a dominant male, or perhaps entire herds composed of males.

This would indicate that the ecological niche of Tragoportax was more connected to open spaces than another very similar antelope found in the same locality (Miotragocerus), which must have preferred more open spaces.

References

Bovines
Prehistoric bovids
Mammals described in 1854
Fossil taxa described in 1854
Prehistoric even-toed ungulate genera